Emmabuntüs is a Linux distribution derived from Debian (previously Ubuntu) and designed to facilitate the restoration of computers donated to humanitarian organizations like the Emmaüs Communities.

The name Emmabuntüs is a portmanteau of Emmaüs and Ubuntu.

Features 
This Linux distribution can be installed, in its entirety, without an Internet connection as all of the required packages are included within the disk image. The disk image includes packages for multiple languages and also optional non-free codecs that the user can choose whether to install or not.
Emmabuntüs says one gigabyte of RAM is required for the distribution's supported releases.
An installation script automatically performs some installation steps (user name, password predefined). The script allows you to choose whether or not to install non-free software and whether or not to uninstall unused languages to save disk space.
Emmabuntüs includes browser plug-ins for data privacy.
There are three dock types to choose from to simplify access to the software and are defined by the type of user (children, beginners and "all").

Desktop environment 
The desktop environment is Xfce with Cairo-Dock. LXQt is also included.

Applications 

Multiple applications are installed that perform the same task in order to provide a choice for each user that uses the system. Here are some examples:

Firefox web browser with some plug-ins and extensions: uBlock Origin, Disconnect, HTTPS Everywhere
E-mail readers: Mozilla Thunderbird
Instant messaging: Pidgin, Jitsi
Transfer tools: FileZilla,  Transmission
Office: AbiWord, Gnumeric, HomeBank, LibreOffice, LibreOffice for schools, Kiwix, Calibre, Scribus
Audio: Audacious Media Player, Audacity, Clementine, PulseAudio, Asunder
Video: Kaffeine, VLC media player, guvcview, Kdenlive, HandBrake
Photo: Nomacs, GIMP, Inkscape
Burning discs: Xfburn
Games: PlayOnLinux, SuperTux, TuxGuitar
Genealogy: Ancestris
Education: GCompris, Stellarium, TuxPaint, TuxMath, Scratch
Utilities: GParted, Wine, CUPS

Releases

See also

List of Linux distributions § Ubuntu-based

References

External links

Emmabuntüs – A Distro Tailor-made For Refurbished Computers
Linux Voice 2 : Linux for humanitarians
Linux Format 216 : A Distro for All Seasons
Full Circle 128 : Review Emmabuntüs DE2 - Stretch 1.00
LinuxInsider : Emmabuntüs Is a Hidden Linux Gem

Debian
Debian-based_distributions
Ubuntu derivatives
X86-64_Linux_distributions
Operating system distributions bootable from read-only media
Linux distributions